This is a list of Swedish record producer Max Martin's songwriting and production credits.

Written and co-written songs
 indicates a song that reached the number-one position on the Billboard Hot 100.

 indicates a song that reached top ten on the Billboard Hot 100.

Cheiron

Maratone/MXM/Wolf Cousins

Productions and co-productions

Maratone/MXM/Wolf Cousins

Top ten singles
The following singles peaked inside the top ten on the Billboard Hot 100 and Hot 100 Airplay.

Number-one singles (Peak date)
"...Baby One More Time" (1999-01-30)
"It's Gonna Be Me" (2000-07-29)
"I Kissed a Girl" (2008-07-05)
"So What" (2008-09-27)
"My Life Would Suck Without You" (2009-02-07)
"3" (2009-10-24)
"California Gurls" (2010-06-19)
"Teenage Dream" (2010-09-18)
"Raise Your Glass" (2010-12-11)
"Hold It Against Me" (2011-01-29)
"E.T." (2011-04-09)
"Last Friday Night (T.G.I.F.)" (2011-08-27)
"Part of Me" (2012-03-03)
"We Are Never Ever Getting Back Together" (2012-09-01)
"One More Night" (2012-09-29)
"Roar" (2013-09-14)
"Dark Horse" (2014-02-08)
"Shake It Off" (2014-09-06)
"Blank Space" (2014-11-29)
"Bad Blood" (2015-06-06)
"Can't Feel My Face" (2015-08-22)
"Can't Stop the Feeling!" (2016-05-28)
"Blinding Lights" (2020-04-04)
"Save Your Tears" (2021-05-08)
"My Universe"(2021-10-09)

Other Top 10 hits (Peak date) Peak
"Do You Know (What It Takes)" (1997-08-02) #7
"Quit Playing Games (with My Heart)" (1997-09-06) #2
"Show Me Love" (1997-11-29) #7
"Everybody (Backstreet's Back)" (1998-05-09) #4
"I Want It That Way" (1999-06-26) #6
"(You Drive Me) Crazy" (1999-11-13) #10
"That's the Way It Is" (2000-03-04) #6
"Show Me the Meaning of Being Lonely" (2000-03-18) #6
"Oops!... I Did It Again" (2000-06-10) #9
"Shape of My Heart" (2000-12-02) #9
"Since U Been Gone" (2005-04-09) #2
"Behind These Hazel Eyes" (2005-06-11) #6
"U + Ur Hand" (2007-05-05) #9
"Who Knew" (2007-09-29) #9
"Hot n Cold" (2008-11-22) #3
"Whataya Want from Me" (2010-05-01) #10
"Dynamite" (2010-08-21) #2
"DJ Got Us Fallin' in Love" (2010-10-09) #4
"Fuckin' Perfect" (2011-02-12) #2
"Blow" (2011-03-19) #7
"Loser Like Me" (2011-04-02) #6
"Till the World Ends" (2011-05-14) #3
"I Wanna Go" (2011-08-20) #7
"The One That Got Away" (2012-01-07) #3
"Domino" (2012-02-18) #6
"Scream" (2012-08-04) #9
"Wide Awake" (2012-08-11) #2
"Beauty and a Beat" (2013-01-05) #5
"I Knew You Were Trouble" (2013-01-12) #2
"Daylight" (2013-02-23) #7
"Problem" (2014-06-07) #2
"Break Free" (2014-08-30 #4
"Bang Bang" (2014-10-04) #3
"Love Me Harder" (2014-11-22) #7
"Love Me Like You Do" (2015-03-07) #3
"Style" (2015-03-21) #6
"Wildest Dreams" (2015-11-07) #5
"Focus" (2015-11-21) #7
"Hands to Myself" (2016-02-13) #7
"Dangerous Woman" (2016-06-11) #8
"Just Like Fire" (2016-06-18) #10
"Send My Love (To Your New Lover)" (2016-09-24) #8
"Side to Side" (2016-12-03) #4
"Chained to the Rhythm" (2017-03-04) #4
"...Ready for It?" (2017-09-23) #4
"No Tears Left to Cry" (2018-05-05) #3
"God Is A Woman" (2018-09-01) #8
"Break Up with Your Girlfriend, I'm Bored" (2019-02-23) #2
"I Don't Care" (2019-05-25) #2
"Stupid Love" (2020-03-14) #5
"Take My Breath" (2021-08-21) #6

References

Pop music discographies
Martin, Max